The 2012 Women's Four Nations Hockey Tournament was a women's field hockey tournament, consisting of a series of test matches. It was held in Terrassa, Spain from 28 February to 2 March 2012, and featured four of the top nations in women's field hockey.

Competition format
The tournament featured the national teams of Belgium, Great Britain, the United States, and the hosts, Spain, competing in a round-robin format, with each team playing each other once. Three points will be awarded for a win, one for a draw, and none for a loss.

Officials
The following umpires were appointed by the FIH to officiate the tournament:

 Blanca Beltrán (ESP)
 Hannah Sanders (ENG)
 Suzanne Sutton (USA)
 Valentina Tomasi (ITA)
 Marine de Witte (BEL)

Results

Standings

Fixtures

Goalscorers

References

External links
Real Federación Española de Hockey

2012 in women's field hockey
field hockey
field hockey
field hockey